Satyanarayana Rao (died 27 April 2021) was an Indian politician and Member of the Lok Sabha for Karimnagar from 1971 to 1984. Rao died from COVID-19 aged 89.

References

1930s births
2021 deaths
India MPs 1980–1984
India MPs 1977–1979
India MPs 1971–1977
Deaths from the COVID-19 pandemic in India
Telangana Praja Samithi politicians
Indian National Congress politicians from Andhra Pradesh
Lok Sabha members from Andhra Pradesh
People from Karimnagar district